Brooke Jenkins (born 1981/1982) is an American lawyer serving as the 30th District Attorney of San Francisco. On July 8, 2022, Jenkins was appointed interim district attorney by Mayor London Breed following the successful recall of Chesa Boudin, for which she actively campaigned. She was elected in her own right to fill the unexpired term the following November. Her time as District Attorney has been characterized as closely aligned with the Mayor’s office and the police officers association.

Early life and education
Jenkins grew up in Union City, California. She was raised by her mother because shortly after her birth, her father had to leave the country due to his student visa status. Her father is from El Salvador. She received a Bachelor of Arts from the University of California, Berkeley and a Juris Doctor from the University of Chicago Law School.

Career
Jenkins previously worked in corporate law. Jenkins’ clients included domestic automakers and foreign car parts manufacturers, including Honda and Takata. Her firm, Bowman and Brooke, was named "Law360’s 2018 Automotive Groups of the Year".

Jenkins worked in the San Francisco District Attorney's Office from 2014 to 2021, where she was former lead hate crimes prosecutor. She faced controversy for ignoring the husband of a victim's family's wishes by insisting on trying to send Daniel Gudino, a mentally ill man, to prison rather than agreeing he was insane and should go to a hospital.  A jury had hung 7-5 in favor of finding him insane after three experts deemed Gudino insane. The District Attorney ultimately decided to stipulate to insanity in accordance with the victim's family's wishes. She resigned in October 2021 to support the recall campaign against San Francisco District Attorney Chesa Boudin. 

Mayor London Breed announced on July 7, 2022 the appointment of Jenkins to serve in the interim until an election is held on November 8, 2022 to elect a District Attorney to serve the rest of Boudin's term through 2023. She was sworn into office on July 8.  Her first act within the office was to hold a meeting with senior staff.  A week later, she fired 15 attorneys, as well as top Boudin advisors like his chief of staff, director of communications and policy advisor, and director of data, research and analytics.    

Between her appointment and August 2022, Jenkins instituted policies such as allowing her attorneys to seek gang enhancements, allowing the conditional prosecution of minors as adults, and making drug dealers ineligible for community courts. 

Jenkins ran in the November 2022 special election to serve the remainder of Boudin's term through 2023. She won with 53.9% of the vote.

On October 13, 2022, retired Superior Court Judge Martha Goldin filed a State Bar complaint against Jenkins, outlining multiple misconduct allegations. Jenkins was paid a six-figure consulting fee by the nonprofit Neighbors for a Better San Francisco, which shares a name and an office with the Chesa Boudin recall campaign. Jenkins had not previously disclosed these payments. In October 2022, a complaint was filed with San Francisco's Ethics Commission and the California Fair Political Practices Commission accusing Jenkins of failing to register as a campaign consultant. The complaint alleged that the $153,000 salary Jenkins received from the nonprofit was intended for partisan purposes.

In October 2022, reporter Joe Eskenazi revealed that just before leaving the District Attorney's Office, Jenkins had sent sensitive files, including a rap sheet, from the District Attorney's office to Assistant District Attorney Don DuBain's personal email and used those materials in the campaign to recall District Attorney Chesa Boudin. In California, disseminating a rap sheet to a person who is unauthorized to receive it is a misdemeanor. Jenkins claimed that she accidentally sent the email to DuBain's personal email.

Personal life
Jenkins lives in Mission Bay with her husband, two children, and her stepdaughter.

References

1980s births
African-American women lawyers
African-American lawyers
District attorneys in California
Hispanic and Latino American lawyers
Living people
People from Union City, California
Politicians from San Francisco
University of California, Berkeley alumni
University of Chicago Law School alumni